George Wilkinson may refer to:

George Wilkinson (music publisher) (1783–1855), English music publisher, and piano and candle manufacturer
George W. Wilkinson (born 1810), American politician from Iowa
George Wilkinson (architect) (1814–1880), designer of workhouses in the British Isles
George Wilkinson (bishop) (1833–1907), Bishop of the Scottish Episcopal Church (Diocese of Saint Andrews, Dunkeld and Dunblane) and Primus
George Wilkinson (water polo) (1879–1946), British Olympics water polo player
Sir George Wilkinson, 1st Baronet (1885–1967), Lord Mayor of London 1940–41
 (1913–1944), agent of the Special Operations Executive (SOE) and on the roll of honour at the Valençay SOE Memorial